Hinthada Township is a township of Hinthada District in the Ayeyarwady Division of Myanmar.

Notable residents
Bhaddanta Āciṇṇa, the Pa-Auk sayadaw

See also
List of villages in Hinthada Township

Townships of Ayeyarwady Region